Joe Devlin (February 7, 1894 – October 1, 1973) was an American actor. He appeared in numerous films and TV series from the 1930s to the 1960s.

Early life
Devlin was born in Manhattan, New York in 1894. Before becoming an actor, Devlin was a vaudeville performer.

Career
Devlin started his acting career during the late 1930s, appearing in films such as Held for Ransom, King of the Underworld, Chasing Trouble, Tight Shoes, Murder in the Big House, Sweethearts of the U.S.A. and Shoot to Kill.

He also appeared in TV series like Front Page Detective, My Hero, The Whistler, Damon Runyon Theater and Hey, Jeannie! among others.

Devlin was famous for his resemblance to Italian fascist dictator Benito Mussolini, whom he played in three films during World War II.

Personal life
Devlin was married to Iva Beaudreau, with whom he had two sons, Robert and William. Both Joe and Iva were vaudeville performers and Iva was a tea leaf reader. He subsequently divorced from Iva Beaudreau.

Death
Devlin died on October 1, 1973 in Burbank, California at the age of 79.

Filmography

Film
 Held for Ransom (1938) – Mark (uncredited)
 Racket Busters (1938) – Truck Driver (uncredited)
 Tenth Avenue Kid (1938) – Card player (uncredited)
 Gangster's Boy (1938) – Jim – Cop (uncredited)
 Paroled from the Big House (1938) – Jed Cross
 Angels with Dirty Faces (1938) – Gangster (uncredited)
 Up the River (1938) – Football player (uncredited)
 Sweethearts (1938) – New York Taxi Driver (uncredited)
 King of the Underworld (1939) – Porky
 The Oklahoma Kid (1939) – Keely – Bartender
 The Mystery of Mr. Wong (1939) – Police Lt. George Devlin
 The Adventures of Jane Arden (1939) – Vanders' Henchman #2 (uncredited)
 Outside These Walls (1939) – Circulation Man (uncredited)
 Panama Lady (1939) – Joe – New York Bartender (uncredited)
 Torchy Runs for Mayor (1939) – Stone – Dolan Henchman (uncredited)
 Hell's Kitchen (1939) – Nails – a Henchman (uncredited)
 Waterfront (1939) – Heintzie – Committee Man (uncredited)
 No Place to Go (1939) – Spud
 Mr. Smith Goes to Washington (1939) – Waiter (uncredited)
 The Roaring Twenties (1939) – Order-Taker (uncredited)
 Another Thin Man (1939) – Barney – Macfay's Bodyguard (uncredited)
 Invisible Stripes (1939) – Mug Who Brings Drink to Chuck (uncredited)
 Chasing Trouble (1940) – Motorcycle Cop
 Three Cheers for the Irish (1940) – Man in Bar with Callagan (uncredited)
 Half a Sinner (1940) – Steve
 Two Girls on Broadway (1940) – Taxi Driver (uncredited)
 A Fugitive from Justice (1940) – Hinky-Dink
 Millionaires in Prison (1940) – Vince Connell (uncredited)
 Carolina Moon (1940) – Racetrack Bookie (uncredited)
 They Drive by Night (1940) – Fatso (uncredited)
 Golden Gloves (1940) – Cloudy Maple (uncredited)
 Strike Up the Band (1940) – 3 Balls 10¢ Attendant (uncredited)
 The Green Hornet Strikes Again! (1941) – Joe Dolan – Henchman
 Maisie Was a Lady (1941) – Man with Seal (uncredited)
 The Great Mr. Nobody (1941) – Used Car Dealer (uncredited)
 A Man Betrayed (1941) – Tramp at Soup Kitchen (uncredited)
 The Penalty (1941) – Shorty (uncredited)
 Sis Hopkins (1941) – Police Detective (uncredited)
 The Flame of New Orleans (1941) – Fourth Sailor (uncredited)
 The People vs. Dr. Kildare (1941) – Cook at Mike's (uncredited)
 Country Fair (1941) – (uncredited)
 Tight Shoes (1941) – Truck Driver (uncredited)
 Whistling in the Dark (1941) – Taxi Driver (uncredited)
 Manpower (1941) – Bartender (uncredited)
 Honky Tonk (1941) – Masher in Saloon (uncredited)
 They Died with Their Boots On (1941) – Joe (uncredited)
 Shadow of the Thin Man (1941) – Mug Starting Fight at Wrestling Match (uncredited)
 Unholy Partners (1941) – Airplane Mechanic (uncredited)
 Steel Against the Sky (1941) – Ed (scenes deleted)
 True to the Army (1942) – Waiter (uncredited)
 Shepherd of the Ozarks (1942) – Louie
 Murder in the Big House (1942) – Mulligan – Motorcycle Policeman (uncredited)
 Larceny, Inc. (1942) – Spud the Umpire (uncredited)
 Syncopation (1942) – House Detective (uncredited)
 Wings for the Eagle (1942) – Service Station Owner (uncredited)
 The Old Homestead (1942) – Henchman Geetus (uncredited)
 The Devil with Hitler (1942) – Benito Mussolini 
 Gentleman Jim (1942) – Hogan (uncredited)
 Fall In (1942) – Sergeant (uncredited)
 They Got Me Covered (1943) – Mussolini (uncredited)
 Slightly Dangerous (1943) – Painter (uncredited)
 Taxi, Mister (1943) – Henchman Stretch
 Lady of Burlesque (1943) – Detective (uncredited)
 That Nazty Nuisance (1943) – Benito Mussolini
 Hi Diddle Diddle (1943) – Dan Hannigan
 The Phantom (1943) – Singapore Smith (uncredited)
 The Miracle of Morgan's Creek (1944) – Benito Mussolini (uncredited)
 Sweethearts of the U.S.A. (1944) – Boss – 1st Robber
 See Here, Private Hargrove (1944) – Mess Hall Sergeant (uncredited)
 Gambler's Choice (1944) – 'Studs' Franco (uncredited)
 Mr. Skeffington (1944) – Boat Employee (uncredited)
 Sensations of 1945 (1944) – Silas Hawkins (uncredited)
 Johnny Doesn't Live Here Any More (1944) – Ice Man (uncredited)
 Delinquent Daughters (1944) – Detective Hanahan
 Dixie Jamboree (1944) – Police Sgt.
 My Buddy (1944) – Nicky Piastro
 Mystery of the River Boat (1944) – Louis Schaber
 The Woman in the Window (1944) – Toll Collector on Henry Hudson Parkway
 Brenda Starr, Reporter (1945) – Police Sgt. Tim Brown (uncredited)
 Roughly Speaking (1945) – Man at Shipyard (uncredited)
 Without Love (1945) – Soldier (uncredited)
 The Master Key (1945) – Bauer (uncredited)
 Pillow to Post (1945) – Al – Army Sergeant in Jeep (uncredited)
 Bedside Manner (1945) – Augustus (uncredited)
 Captain Eddie (1945) – Brewery Worker (uncredited)
 Boston Blackie's Rendezvous (1945) – Cab Driver Steve Caveroni (uncredited)
 The Shanghai Cobra (1945) – Taylor
 Her Highness and the Bellboy (1945) – Bartender (uncredited)
 Abbott and Costello in Hollywood (1945) – Kelly – Bartender (uncredited)
 Scarlet Street (1945) – Joe Williams, Morning World (uncredited)
 The Hoodlum Saint (1946) – Bartender (scenes deleted)
 The Bachelor's Daughters (1946) – Briggs (uncredited)
 Criminal Court (1946) – Clark J. 'Brownie' Brown
 Bringing Up Father (1946) – Casey – the Hotel Superintendent
 San Quentin (1946) – 'Broadway' Johnson
 The Mighty McGurk (1947) – Dog Man (uncredited)
 The Man I Love (1947) – Waiter (uncredited)
 That Way with Women (1947) – Police Desk Sergeant
 Shoot to Kill (1947) – Smokey
 Fun on a Weekend (1947) – Clothing Shop Proprietor (uncredited)
 Body and Soul (1947) – Prince (uncredited)
 Always Together (1947) – First Cab Driver (uncredited)
 My Wild Irish Rose (1947) – Man in Olympic Theatre Balco (uncredited)
 Killer McCoy (1947) – Cigar Smoking Fight Fan (uncredited)
 If You Knew Susie (1948) – Silent Cy (uncredited)
 The Enchanted Valley (1948) – Bugs Mason
 Bodyguard (1948) – Detective Sgt. Burch (uncredited)
 A Song Is Born (1948) – Adams' Henchman (uncredited)
 Blood on the Moon (1948) – Barney – Bartender (uncredited)
 El Paso (1949) – Bartender at Casa Grande (uncredited)
 A Kiss in the Dark (1949) – Stage Electrician (uncredited)
 Night Unto Night (1949) – Joe, Truckman (uncredited)
 Mighty Joe Young (1949) – Reporter (uncredited)
 Jiggs and Maggie in Jackpot Jitters (1949) – Casey (uncredited)
 The Jackie Robinson Story (1950) – Tough Lodge Members in Stands (uncredited)
 Our Very Own (1950) – Card Player (uncredited)
 Pretty Baby (1950) – Waiter (uncredited)
 Insurance Investigator (1951) – Malone's Henchman (uncredited)
 Stop That Cab (1951) – Short Cop (uncredited)
 On Dangerous Ground (1951) – Bartender (uncredited)
 Double Dynamite (1951) – Frankie Boy (uncredited)
 Bitter Creek (1954) – Pat – Bartender
 Silver Lode (1954) – Wait Little (uncredited)
 Prince of Players (1955) – Theatre Shill (uncredited)
 Abbott and Costello Meet the Keystone Kops (1955) – Mike – Policeman (uncredited)
 Tennessee's Partner (1955) – Prendergast
 While the City Sleeps (1956) – Newspaper Teletype Operator (uncredited)
 Three for Jamie Dawn (1956) – 1st Jury Room Guard (uncredited)
 Shake, Rattle & Rock! (1956) – Squad Car Officer
 The Wayward Bus (1957) – Bus Dispatcher (uncredited)
 The Restless Breed (1957) – Morton (uncredited)
 Calypso Heat Wave (1957) – Room Service Waiter (uncredited)
 Up in Smoke (1957) – Al
 The Gift of Love (1958) – Bar & Grill Waiter (uncredited)
 Hell's Five Hours (1958) – Cook (uncredited)
 The Decks Ran Red (1958) – Crewman (uncredited)
 The Last Hurrah (1958) – Man (uncredited)
 The Ugly Dachshund (1966) – Dog Owner (uncredited)
 The Last of the Secret Agents? (1966) – Waiter-Spy (uncredited)
 Good Times (1967) – Bartender

Television
 Front Page Detective – Death of a Hero (1951) TV Episode .... uncredited
 My Hero – Horse Trail (1952) TV Episode .... Spike
 The Abbott and Costello Show – Las Vegas (1953) TV Episode .... Bit – From Bed to Worse (1954) TV Episode .... Man – Barber Lou (1954) TV Episode .... Motorcycle Cop (uncredited)
 I Married Joan – Party Line (1954) TV Episode .... uncredited – Two Saint Bernards (1954) TV Episode .... Police Dispatcher
 The Adventures of Rin Tin Tin – Rin Tin Tin, Outlaw (1954) TV Episode .... Major Phillips
 Topper – Topper's Amnesia (1955) TV Episode .... Max
 TV Reader's Digest – How Charlie Faust Won a Pennant for the Giants (1955) TV Episode .... uncredited
 The Whistler – Death Sentence (1955) TV Episode .... Bartender
 My Little Margie – Buried Treasure (1953) TV Episode .... Joe – Margie's Elopement (1955) TV Episode .... Mr. Rivers
 Celebrity Playhouse – Bachelor Husband (1956) TV Episode .... Phone Man
 Damon Runyon Theater – Tobias the Terrible (1955) TV Episode .... Happy – Blonde Mink (1955) TV Episode .... uncredited – Cleo (1956) TV Episode .... uncredited – The Pigeon Gets Plucked (1956) TV Episode .... uncredited
 NBC Matinee Theater – Statute of Limitations (1956) TV Episode .... Mervin
 Our Miss Brooks – Geraldine (1956) TV Episode .... Policeman
 Hey, Jeannie! – Jeannie's Here (1956) TV Episode .... N.Y. policeman
 The Life of Riley – Riley, the Animal Lover (1953) TV Episode .... Policeman – Vacation Plans (1957) TV Episode .... The Guard
 Death Valley Days – Solomon in All His Glory (1953) TV Episode .... Paddy the Bartender (uncredited) – Quong Kee (1957) TV Episode .... Charlie Moran
 Wanted Dead or Alive – Baa Baa (1961) TV Episode .... Larry
 Holiday Lodge – Wanted: Two Recreation Directors (1961) TV Episode .... Smitty
 The Dick Van Dyke Show – Forty-Four Tickets (1961) TV Episode .... Shabby Man
 The Hathaways – The Paint Job (1962) TV Episode .... Gateman
 Gunsmoke – Catawomper (1962) TV Episode .... Jester – Reprisal (1962) TV Episode .... Dan Binny – The Boys (1962) TV Episode .... Drummer
 The Danny Thomas Show – The Baby Hates Charley (1962) TV Episode .... Policeman
 Dennis the Menace – Poor Mr. Wilson (1962) TV Episode .... Needy Man #1 (uncredited) 
 Bob Hope Presents the Chrysler Theatre – The Square Peg (1964) TV Episode .... Zakaris

References

External links

 

1894 births
1973 deaths
20th-century American male actors
American male television actors
Male actors from New York City
People from Manhattan